The United Nations Educational, Scientific and Cultural Organization is a specialized agency of the United Nations (UN) aimed at promoting world peace and security through international cooperation in education, arts, sciences and culture. It has 193 member states and 12 associate members, as well as partners in the non-governmental, intergovernmental and private sector. Headquartered at the World Heritage Centre in Paris, France, UNESCO has 53 regional field offices and 199 national commissions that facilitate its global mandate.

UNESCO was founded in 1945 as the successor to the League of Nations's International Committee on Intellectual Cooperation. Its constitution establishes the agency's goals, governing structure, and operating framework. UNESCO's founding mission, which was shaped by the Second World War, is to advance peace, sustainable development and human rights by facilitating collaboration and dialogue among nations. It pursues this objective through five major programme areas: education, natural sciences, social/human sciences, culture and communication/information. UNESCO sponsors projects that improve literacy, provide technical training and education, advance science, protect independent media and press freedom, preserve regional and cultural history, and promote cultural diversity.

As a focal point for world culture and science, UNESCO's activities have broadened over the years; it assists in the translation and dissemination of world literature, helps establish and secure World Heritage Sites of cultural and natural importance, works to bridge the worldwide digital divide, and creates inclusive knowledge societies through information and communication. UNESCO has launched several initiatives and global movements, such as Education For All, to further advance its core objectives.

UNESCO is governed by the General Conference, composed of member states and associate members, which meets biannually to set the agency's programmes and the budget. It also elects members of the executive board, which manages UNESCO's work, and appoints every four years a Director-General, who serves as UNESCO's chief administrator. UNESCO is a member of the United Nations Sustainable Development Group, a coalition of UN agencies and organisations aimed at fulfilling the Sustainable Development Goals.

History

Origins 

UNESCO and its mandate for international cooperation can be traced back to a League of Nations resolution on 21 September 1921, to elect a Commission to study the feasibility of having nations freely share cultural, educational and scientific achievements. This new body, the International Committee on Intellectual Cooperation (ICIC), was created in 1922 and counted such figures as Henri Bergson, Albert Einstein, Marie Curie, Robert A. Millikan, and Gonzague de Reynold among its members (being thus a small commission of the League of Nations essentially centred on Western Europe). The International Institute for Intellectual Cooperation (IIIC) was then created in Paris in September 1924, to act as the executing agency for the ICIC. However, the onset of World War II largely interrupted the work of these predecessor organizations. As for private initiatives, the International Bureau of Education (IBE) began to work as a non-governmental organization in the service of international educational development since December 1925  and joined UNESCO in 2021, after having established a joint commission in 1952.

Creation 

After the signing of the Atlantic Charter and the Declaration of the United Nations, the Conference of Allied Ministers of Education (CAME) began meetings in London which continued from 16 November 1942 to 5 December 1945. On 30 October 1943, the necessity for an international organization was expressed in the Moscow Declaration, agreed upon by China, the United Kingdom, the United States and the USSR. This was followed by the Dumbarton Oaks Conference proposals of 9 October 1944. Upon the proposal of CAME and in accordance with the recommendations of the United Nations Conference on International Organization (UNCIO), held in San Francisco in April–June 1945, a United Nations Conference for the establishment of an educational and cultural organization (ECO/CONF) was convened in London 1–16 November 1945 with 44 governments represented. The idea of UNESCO was largely developed by Rab Butler, the Minister of Education for the United Kingdom, who had a great deal of influence in its development. At the ECO/CONF, the Constitution of UNESCO was introduced and signed by 37 countries, and a Preparatory Commission was established. The Preparatory Commission operated between 16 November 1945, and 4 November 1946—the date when UNESCO's Constitution came into force with the deposit of the twentieth ratification by a member state.

The first General Conference took place from 19 November to 10 December 1946, and elected Julian Huxley to Director-General. U.S. Colonel, university president and civil rights advocate Blake R. Van Leer joined as a member as well. The Constitution was amended in November 1954 when the General Conference resolved that members of the executive board would be representatives of the governments of the States of which they are nationals and would not, as before, act in their personal capacity. This change in governance distinguished UNESCO from its predecessor, the ICIC, in how member states would work together in the organization's fields of competence. As member states worked together over time to realize UNESCO's mandate, political and historical factors have shaped the organization's operations in particular during the Cold War, the decolonization process, and the dissolution of the USSR.

Development 

Among the major achievements of the organization is its work against racism, for example through influential statements on race starting with a declaration of anthropologists (among them was Claude Lévi-Strauss) and other scientists in 1950 and concluding with the 1978 Declaration on Race and Racial Prejudice.

In 1956, the Republic of South Africa withdrew from UNESCO saying that some of the organization's publications amounted to "interference" in the country's "racial problems". South Africa rejoined the organization in 1994 under the leadership of Nelson Mandela.

UNESCO's early work in the field of education included the pilot project on fundamental education in the Marbial Valley, Haiti, started in 1947. This project was followed by expert missions to other countries, including, for example, a mission to Afghanistan in 1949. In 1948, UNESCO recommended that Member States should make free primary education compulsory and universal. In 1990, the World Conference on Education for All, in Jomtien, Thailand, launched a global movement to provide basic education for all children, youths and adults. Ten years later, the 2000 World Education Forum held in Dakar, Senegal, led member governments to commit to achieving basic education for all by 2015.

UNESCO's early activities in culture included the International Campaign to Save the Monuments of Nubia, launched in 1960. The purpose of the campaign was to move the Great Temple of Abu Simbel to keep it from being swamped by the Nile after the construction of the Aswan Dam. During the 20-year campaign, 22 monuments and architectural complexes were relocated. This was the first and largest in a series of campaigns including Mohenjo-daro (Pakistan), Fes (Morocco), Kathmandu (Nepal), Borobudur (Indonesia) and the Acropolis of Athens (Greece). The organization's work on heritage led to the adoption, in 1972, of the Convention concerning the Protection of the World Cultural and Natural Heritage. The World Heritage Committee was established in 1976 and the first sites inscribed on the World Heritage List in 1978. Since then important legal instruments on cultural heritage and diversity have been adopted by UNESCO member states in 2003 (Convention for the Safeguarding of the Intangible Cultural Heritage) and 2005 (Convention on the Protection and Promotion of the Diversity of Cultural Expressions).

An intergovernmental meeting of UNESCO in Paris in December 1951 led to the creation of the European Council for Nuclear Research, which was responsible for establishing the European Organization for Nuclear Research (CERN) later on, in 1954.

Arid Zone programming, 1948–1966, is another example of an early major UNESCO project in the field of natural sciences.

In 1968, UNESCO organized the first intergovernmental conference aimed at reconciling the environment and development, a problem that continues to be addressed in the field of sustainable development. The main outcome of the 1968 conference was the creation of UNESCO's Man and the Biosphere Programme.

UNESCO has been credited with the diffusion of national science bureaucracies.

In the field of communication, the "free flow of ideas by word and image" has been in UNESCO's constitution from its beginnings, following the experience of the Second World War when control of information was a factor in indoctrinating populations for aggression. In the years immediately following World War II, efforts were concentrated on reconstruction and on the identification of needs for means of mass communication around the world. UNESCO started organizing training and education for journalists in the 1950s. In response to calls for a "New World Information and Communication Order" in the late 1970s, UNESCO established the International Commission for the Study of Communication Problems, which produced the 1980 MacBride report (named after the chair of the commission, the Nobel Peace Prize laureate Seán MacBride). The same year, UNESCO created the International Programme for the Development of Communication (IPDC), a multilateral forum designed to promote media development in developing countries. In 1991, UNESCO's General Conference endorsed the Windhoek Declaration on media independence and pluralism, which led the UN General Assembly to declare the date of its adoption, 3 May, as World Press Freedom Day. Since 1997, UNESCO has awarded the UNESCO / Guillermo Cano World Press Freedom Prize every 3 May.

21st century 

UNESCO admitted Palestine as a member in 2011.

Laws passed in the United States after Palestine applied for UNESCO and WHO membership in April 1989 mean that the US cannot contribute financially to any UN organisation that accepts Palestine as a full member. As a result, the US withdrew its funding, which had accounted for about 22% of UNESCO's budget. Israel also reacted to Palestine's admittance to UNESCO by freezing Israeli payments to UNESCO and imposing sanctions on the Palestinian Authority, stating that Palestine's admittance would be detrimental "to potential peace talks". Two years after they stopped paying their dues to UNESCO, the US and Israel lost UNESCO voting rights in 2013 without losing the right to be elected; thus, the US was elected as a member of the executive board for the period 2016–19. In 2019, Israel left UNESCO after 69 years of membership, with Israel's ambassador to the UN Danny Danon writing: "UNESCO is the body that continually rewrites history, including by erasing the Jewish connection to Jerusalem... it is corrupted and manipulated by Israel's enemies... we are not going to be a member of an organisation that deliberately acts against us".

Activities 

UNESCO implements its activities through the five programme areas: education, natural sciences, social and human sciences, culture, and communication and information.

 UNESCO supports research in comparative education, provides expertise and fosters partnerships to strengthen national educational leadership and the capacity of countries to offer quality education for all. This includes the
 UNESCO Chairs, an international network of 644 UNESCO Chairs, involving over 770 institutions in 126 countries
 Environmental Conservation Organisation
 Convention against Discrimination in Education adopted in 1960
 Organization of the International Conference on Adult Education (CONFINTEA) in an interval of 12 years
 Publication of the Education for All Global Monitoring Report
 Publication of the Four Pillars of Learning seminal document
 UNESCO ASPNet, an international network of 8,000 schools in 170 countries

UNESCO does not accredit institutions of higher learning.

 UNESCO also issues public statements to educate the public:
 Seville Statement on Violence: A statement adopted by UNESCO in 1989 to refute the notion that humans are biologically predisposed to organised violence.
 Designating projects and places of cultural and scientific significance, such as:
 Global Geoparks Network
 Biosphere reserves, through the Programme on Man and the Biosphere (MAB), since 1971
 City of Literature; in 2007, the first city to be given this title was Edinburgh, the site of Scotland's first circulating library. In 2008, Iowa City, Iowa, became the City of Literature.
 Endangered languages and linguistic diversity projects (UNESCO Atlas of the World's Languages in Danger)
 Masterpieces of the Oral and Intangible Heritage of Humanity
 Memory of the World International Register, since 1997
 Water resources management, through the International Hydrological Programme (IHP), since 1965
 World Heritage Sites
 World Digital Library
 Encouraging the "free flow of ideas by images and words" by:
 Promoting freedom of expression, including freedom of the press and freedom of information legislation, through the Division of Freedom of Expression and Media Development, including the International Programme for the Development of Communication
 Promoting the safety of journalists and combatting impunity for those who attack them, through coordination of the UN Plan of Action on the Safety of Journalists and the Issue of Impunity
 Promoting universal access to and preservation of information and open solutions for sustainable development through the Knowledge Societies Division, including the Memory of the World Programme and Information for All Programme
 Promoting pluralism, gender equality and cultural diversity in the media
 Promoting Internet Universality and its principles, that the Internet should be (I) human Rights-based, (ii) Open, (iii) Accessible to all, and (iv) nurtured by Multi-stakeholder participation (summarized as the acronym R.O.A.M.)
 Generating knowledge through publications such as World Trends in Freedom of Expression and Media Development, the UNESCO Series on Internet Freedom, and the Media Development Indicators, as well as other indicator-based studies.
 Promoting events, such as:
 International Decade for the Promotion of a Culture of Peace and Non-Violence for the Children of the World: 2001–2010, proclaimed by the UN in 1998
 World Press Freedom Day, 3 May each year, to promote freedom of expression and freedom of the press as a basic human right and as crucial components of any healthy, democratic and free society.
 Criança Esperança in Brazil, in partnership with Rede Globo, to raise funds for community-based projects that foster social integration and violence prevention.
 International Literacy Day, 8 September each year
 International Year for the Culture of Peace, 2000
 Health Education for Behavior Change programme in partnership with the Ministry of Education of Kenya which was financially supported by the Government of Azerbaijan to promote health education among 10-19-year-old young people who live in informal camp in Kibera, Nairobi. The project was carried out between September 2014 – December 2016.
 World Day for Cultural Diversity for Dialogue and Development 21 May each year
 Founding and funding projects, such as:
 Migration Museums Initiative: Promoting the establishment of museums for cultural dialogue with migrant populations.
 UNESCO-CEPES, the European Centre for Higher Education: established in 1972 in Bucharest, Romania, as a decentralized office to promote international co-operation in higher education in Europe as well as Canada, USA and Israel. Higher Education in Europe is its official journal.
 Free Software Directory: since 1998 UNESCO and the Free Software Foundation have jointly funded this project cataloguing free software.
 FRESH, Focusing Resources on Effective School Health
 OANA, Organization of Asia-Pacific News Agencies
 International Council of Science
 UNESCO Goodwill Ambassadors
 ASOMPS, Asian Symposium on Medicinal Plants and Spices, a series of scientific conferences held in Asia
 Botany 2000, a programme supporting taxonomy, and biological and cultural diversity of medicinal and ornamental plants, and their protection against environmental pollution
 The UNESCO Collection of Representative Works, translating works of world literature both to and from multiple languages, from 1948 to 2005
 GoUNESCO, an umbrella of initiatives to make heritage fun supported by UNESCO, New Delhi Office
 UNESCO-CHIC BIRUP, UNESCO-CHIC Group (China) Biosphere Rural and Urbanization Programme

The UNESCO transparency portal has been designed to enable public access to information regarding the Organization's activities, such as its aggregate budget for a biennium, as well as links to relevant programmatic and financial documents. These two distinct sets of information are published on the IATI registry, respectively based on the IATI Activity Standard and the IATI Organization Standard.

There have been proposals to establish two new UNESCO lists. The first proposed list will focus on movable cultural heritage such as artifacts, paintings, and biofacts. The list may include cultural objects, such as the Jōmon Venus of Japan, the Mona Lisa of France, the Gebel el-Arak Knife of Egypt, The Ninth Wave of Russia, the Seated Woman of Çatalhöyük of Turkey, the David (Michelangelo) of Italy, the Mathura Herakles of India, the Manunggul Jar of the Philippines, the Crown of Baekje of South Korea, The Hay Wain of the United Kingdom and the Benin Bronzes of Nigeria. The second proposed list will focus on the world's living species, such as the komodo dragon of Indonesia, the panda of China, the bald eagle of North American countries, the aye-aye of Madagascar, the Asiatic lion of India, the kakapo of New Zealand, and the mountain tapir of Colombia, Ecuador and Peru.

Media 

UNESCO and its specialized institutions issue a number of magazines.

The UNESCO Courier magazine states its mission to "promote UNESCO's ideals, maintain a platform for the dialogue between cultures and provide a forum for international debate". Since March 2006 it has been available online, with limited printed issues. Its articles express the opinions of the authors which are not necessarily the opinions of UNESCO. There was a hiatus in publishing between 2012 and 2017.

In 1950, UNESCO initiated the quarterly review Impact of Science on Society (also known as Impact) to discuss the influence of science on society. The journal ceased publication in 1992. UNESCO also published Museum International Quarterly from the year 1948.

Official UNESCO NGOs 

UNESCO has official relations with 322 international non-governmental organizations (NGOs). Most of these are what UNESCO calls "operational"; a select few are "formal". The highest form of affiliation to UNESCO is "formal associate", and the 22 NGOs with formal associate (ASC) relations occupying offices at UNESCO are:

Institutes and centres 

The institutes are specialized departments of the organization that support UNESCO's programme, providing specialized support for cluster and national offices.

Prizes 

UNESCO awards 22 prizes in education, science, culture and peace:

 Félix Houphouët-Boigny Peace Prize
 L'Oréal-UNESCO Awards for Women in Science
 UNESCO/King Sejong Literacy Prize
 UNESCO/Confucius Prize for Literacy
 UNESCO/Emir Jaber al-Ahmad al-Jaber al-Sabah Prize to promote Quality Education for Persons with Intellectual Disabilities
 UNESCO King Hamad Bin Isa Al-Khalifa Prize for the Use of Information and Communication Technologies in Education
 UNESCO/Hamdan Bin Rashid Al-Maktoum Prize for Outstanding Practice and Performance in Enhancing the Effectiveness of Teachers
 UNESCO/Kalinga Prize for the Popularization of Science
 UNESCO/Institut Pasteur Medal for an outstanding contribution to the development of scientific knowledge that has a beneficial impact on human health
 UNESCO/Sultan Qaboos Prize for Environmental Preservation
 Great Man-Made River International Water Prize for Water Resources in Arid Zones presented by UNESCO (title to be reconsidered)
 Michel Batisse Award for Biosphere Reserve Management
 UNESCO/Bilbao Prize for the Promotion of a Culture of Human Rights
 UNESCO Prize for Peace Education
 UNESCO-Madanjeet Singh Prize for the Promotion of Tolerance and Non-Violence
 UNESCO/International José Martí Prize
 UNESCO/Avicenna Prize for Ethics in Science
 UNESCO/Juan Bosch Prize for the Promotion of Social Science Research in Latin America and the Caribbean
 Sharjah Prize for Arab Culture
 Melina Mercouri International Prize for the Safeguarding and Management of Cultural Landscapes (UNESCO-Greece)
 IPDC-UNESCO Prize for Rural Communication
 UNESCO/Guillermo Cano World Press Freedom Prize
 UNESCO/Jikji Memory of the World Prize
 UNESCO-Equatorial Guinea International Prize for Research in the Life Sciences
 Carlos J. Finlay Prize for Microbiology

Inactive prizes 

 International Simón Bolívar Prize (inactive since 2004)
 UNESCO Prize for Human Rights Education
 UNESCO/Obiang Nguema Mbasogo International Prize for Research in the Life Sciences (inactive since 2010)
 UNESCO Prize for the Promotion of the Arts

International Days observed at UNESCO 

International Days observed at UNESCO is provided in the table given below:

Member states 

As of January 2019, UNESCO has 193 member states and 11 associate members. Some members are not independent states and some members have additional National Organizing Committees from some of their dependent territories. UNESCO state parties are the United Nations member states (except Liechtenstein, United States and Israel), as well as Cook Islands, Niue and Palestine. The United States and Israel left UNESCO on 31 December 2018.

Governing bodies

Director-General 

As of 2022, there have been 11 Directors-General of UNESCO since its inceptionnine men and two women. The 11 Directors-General of UNESCO have come from six regions within the organization: West Europe (5), Central America (1), North America (2), West Africa (1), East Asia (1), and East Europe (1).

To date, there has been no elected Director-General from the remaining ten regions within UNESCO: Southeast Asia, South Asia, Central and North Asia, Middle East, North Africa, East Africa, Central Africa, South Africa, Australia-Oceania, and South America.

The list of the Directors-General of UNESCO since its establishment in 1946 is as follows:

General Conference 

This is the list of the sessions of the UNESCO General Conference held since 1946:

Executive Board

Offices and headquarters 

The UNESCO headquarters, the World Heritage Centre, is located at Place de Fontenoy in Paris, France. Its architect was Marcel Breuer. It includes a Garden of Peace which was donated by the Government of Japan. This garden was designed by American-Japanese sculptor artist Isamu Noguchi in 1958 and installed by Japanese gardener Toemon Sano. In 1994–1995, in memory of the 50th anniversary of UNESCO, a meditation room was built by Tadao Ando.

UNESCO's field offices across the globe are categorized into four primary office types based upon their function and geographic coverage: cluster offices, national offices, regional bureaus and liaison offices.

Field offices by region 

The following list of all UNESCO Field Offices is organized geographically by UNESCO Region and identifies the members states and associate members of UNESCO which are served by each office.

Africa 

 Abidjan – National Office to Côte d'Ivoire
 Abuja – National Office to Nigeria
 Accra – Cluster Office for Benin, Côte d'Ivoire, Ghana, Liberia, Nigeria, Sierra Leone and Togo
 Addis Ababa – Liaison Office with the African Union and with the Economic Commission for Africa
 Bamako – Cluster Office for Burkina Faso, Guinea, Mali and Niger
 Brazzaville – National Office to the Republic of the Congo
 Bujumbura – National Office to Burundi
 Dakar – Regional Bureau for Education in Africa and Cluster Office for Cape Verde, Gambia, Guinea-Bissau, and Senegal
 Dar es Salaam – Cluster Office for Comoros, Madagascar, Mauritius, Seychelles and Tanzania
 Harare – Cluster Office for Botswana, Malawi, Mozambique, Zambia and Zimbabwe
 Juba – National Office to South Sudan
 Kinshasa – National Office to the Democratic Republic of the Congo
 Libreville – Cluster Office for the Republic of the Congo, Democratic Republic of the Congo, Equatorial Guinea, Gabon and São Tomé and Príncipe
 Maputo – National Office to Mozambique
 Nairobi – Regional Bureau for Sciences in Africa and Cluster Office for Burundi, Djibouti, Eritrea, Kenya, Rwanda, Somalia, South Sudan and Uganda
 Windhoek – National Office to Namibia
 Yaoundé – Cluster Office to Cameroon, Central African Republic and Chad

Arab States 

 Amman – National Office to Jordan
 Beirut – Regional Bureau for Education in the Arab States and Cluster Office to Lebanon, Syria, Jordan, Iraq and Palestine
 Cairo – Regional Bureau for Sciences in the Arab States and Cluster Office for Egypt and Sudan
 Doha – Cluster Office to Bahrain, Kuwait, Oman, Qatar, Saudi Arabia, United Arab Emirates and Yemen
 Iraq – National Office for Iraq (currently located in Amman, Jordan)
 Khartoum – National Office to Sudan
 Manama – Arab Regional Centre for World Heritage
 Rabat – Cluster Office to Algeria, Libya, Mauritania, Morocco and Tunisia
 Ramallah – National Office to the Palestinian Territories

Asia and Pacific 

 Almaty – Cluster Office to Kazakhstan, Kyrgyzstan, Tajikistan and Uzbekistan
 Apia – Cluster Office to Australia, Cook Islands, Fiji, Kiribati, Marshall Islands, Federated States of Micronesia, Nauru, New Zealand, Niue, Palau, Papua New Guinea, Samoa, Solomon Islands, Tonga, Tuvalu, Vanuatu and Tokelau (Associate Member)
 Bangkok – Regional Bureau for Education in Asia and the Pacific and Cluster Office to Thailand, Burma, Laos, Singapore and Vietnam
 Beijing – Cluster Office to North Korea, Japan, Mongolia, the People's Republic of China and South Korea
 Dhaka – National Office to Bangladesh
 Hanoi – National Office to Vietnam
 Islamabad – National Office to Pakistan
 Jakarta – Regional Bureau for Sciences in Asia and the Pacific and Cluster Office to the Philippines, Brunei, Indonesia, Malaysia, and East Timor
 Manila – National Office to the Philippines
 Kabul – National Office to Afghanistan
 Kathmandu – National Office to Nepal
 New Delhi – Cluster Office to Bangladesh, Bhutan, India, Maldives and Sri Lanka
 Phnom Penh – National Office to Cambodia
 Tashkent – National Office to Uzbekistan
 Tehran – Cluster Office to Afghanistan, Iran, Pakistan and Turkmenistan

Europe and North America 

 Brussels – Liaison Office to the European Union and its subsidiary bodies in Brussels
 Geneva – Liaison Office to the United Nations in Geneva
 New York City – Liaison Office to the United Nations in New York
 Venice – Regional Bureau for Sciences and Culture in Europe

Latin America and the Caribbean 

 Brasília – National Office to Brazil
 Guatemala City – National Office to Guatemala
 Havana – Regional Bureau for Culture in Latin America and the Caribbean and Cluster Office to Cuba, Dominican Republic, Haiti and Aruba
 Kingston – Cluster Office to Antigua and Barbuda, Bahamas, Barbados, Belize, Dominica, Grenada, Guyana, Jamaica, Saint Kitts and Nevis, Saint Lucia, Saint Vincent and the Grenadines, Suriname and Trinidad and Tobago as well as the associate member states of British Virgin Islands, Cayman Islands, Curaçao and Sint Maarten
 Lima – National Office to Peru
 Mexico City – National Office to Mexico
 Montevideo – Regional Bureau for Sciences in Latin America and the Caribbean and Cluster Office to Argentina, Brazil, Chile, Paraguay and Uruguay
 Port-au-Prince – National Office to Haiti
 Quito – Cluster Office to Bolivia, Colombia, Ecuador and Venezuela
 San José – Cluster Office to Costa Rica, El Salvador, Guatemala, Honduras, Mexico, Nicaragua and Panama
 Santiago de Chile – Regional Bureau for Education in Latin America and the Caribbean and National Office to Chile

Partner Organisations 

 International Committee of the Red Cross (ICRC)
 Blue Shield International (BSI)
 International Council of Museums (ICOM)
 International Council on Monuments and Sites (ICOMOS)
 International Institute of Humanitarian Law (IIHL)

Controversies

New World Information and Communication Order 

UNESCO has been the centre of controversy in the past, particularly in its relationships with the United States, the United Kingdom, Singapore and the former Soviet Union. During the 1970s and 1980s, UNESCO's support for a "New World Information and Communication Order" and its MacBride report calling for democratization of the media and more egalitarian access to information was condemned in these countries as attempts to curb freedom of the press. UNESCO was perceived as a platform for communists and Third World dictators to attack the West, in contrast to accusations made by the USSR in the late 1940s and early 1950s. In 1984, the United States withheld its contributions and withdrew from the organization in protest, followed by the United Kingdom in 1985. Singapore withdrew also at the end of 1985, citing rising membership fees. Following a change of government in 1997, the UK rejoined. The United States rejoined in 2003, followed by Singapore on 8 October 2007.

Israel 

Israel was admitted to UNESCO in 1949, one year after its creation. Israel has maintained its membership since 1949.
In 2010, Israel designated the Cave of the Patriarchs, Hebron and Rachel's Tomb, Bethlehem as National Heritage Sites and announced restoration work, prompting criticism from the Obama administration and protests from Palestinians. In October 2010, UNESCO's executive board voted to declare the sites as "al-Haram al-Ibrahimi/Tomb of the Patriarchs" and "Bilal bin Rabah Mosque/Rachel's Tomb" and stated that they were "an integral part of the occupied Palestinian Territories" and any unilateral Israeli action was a violation of international law.
UNESCO described the sites as significant to "people of the Muslim, Christian and Jewish traditions", and accused Israel of highlighting only the Jewish character of the sites.
Israel in turn accused UNESCO of "detach[ing] the Nation of Israel from its heritage", and accused it of being politically motivated.
The Rabbi of the Western Wall said that Rachel's tomb had not previously been declared a holy Muslim site. Israel partially suspended ties with UNESCO. Israeli Deputy Foreign Minister Danny Ayalon declared that the resolution was a "part of Palestinian escalation".
Zevulun Orlev, chairman of the Knesset Education and Culture Committee, referred to the resolutions as an attempt to undermine the mission of UNESCO as a scientific and cultural organization that promotes cooperation throughout the world.

On 28 June 2011, UNESCO's World Heritage Committee, at Jordan's insistence, censured Israel's decision to demolish and rebuild the Mughrabi Gate Bridge in Jerusalem for safety reasons. Israel stated that Jordan had signed an agreement with Israel stipulating that the existing bridge must be dismantled for safety reasons; Jordan disputed the agreement, saying that it was only signed under U.S. pressure. Israel was also unable to address the UNESCO committee over objections from Egypt.

In January 2014, days before it was scheduled to open, UNESCO Director-General, Irina Bokova, "indefinitely postponed" and effectively cancelled an exhibit created by the Simon Wiesenthal Centre entitled "The People, The Book, The Land: The 3,500-year relationship between the Jewish people and the Land of Israel". The event was scheduled to run from 21 January through 30 January in Paris. Bokova cancelled the event after representatives of Arab states at UNESCO argued that its display would "harm the peace process". The author of the exhibition, Professor Robert Wistrich of the Hebrew University's Vidal Sassoon International Centre for the Study of Anti-Semitism, called the cancellation an "appalling act", and characterized Bokova's decision as "an arbitrary act of total cynicism and, really, contempt for the Jewish people and its history". UNESCO amended the decision to cancel the exhibit within the year, and it quickly achieved popularity and was viewed as a great success.

On 1 January 2019, Israel formally left UNESCO in pursuance of the US withdrawal over the perceived continuous anti-Israel bias.

Occupied Palestine Resolution 

On 13 October 2016, UNESCO passed a resolution on East Jerusalem that condemned Israel for "aggressions" by Israeli police and soldiers and "illegal measures" against the freedom of worship and Muslims' access to their holy sites, while also recognizing Israel as the occupying power. Palestinian leaders welcomed the decision. While the text acknowledged the "importance of the Old City of Jerusalem and its walls for the three monotheistic religions", it referred to the sacred hilltop compound in Jerusalem's Old City only by its Muslim name "Al-Haram al-Sharif", Arabic for Noble Sanctuary. In response, Israel denounced the UNESCO resolution for its omission of the words "Temple Mount" or "Har HaBayit", stating that it denies Jewish ties to the key holy site. After receiving criticism from numerous Israeli politicians and diplomats, including Benjamin Netanyahu and Ayelet Shaked, Israel froze all ties with the organization. The resolution was condemned by Ban Ki-moon and the Director-General of UNESCO, Irina Bokova, who said that Judaism, Islam and Christianity have clear historical connections to Jerusalem and "to deny, conceal or erase any of the Jewish, Christian or Muslim traditions undermines the integrity of the site. "Al-Aqsa Mosque [or] Al-Haram al-Sharif" is also Temple Mount, whose Western Wall is the holiest place in Judaism." It was also rejected by the Czech Parliament which said the resolution reflects a "hateful anti-Israel sentiment", and hundreds of Italian Jews demonstrated in Rome over Italy's abstention. On 26 October, UNESCO approved a reviewed version of the resolution, which also criticized Israel for its continuous "refusal to let the body's experts access Jerusalem's holy sites to determine their conservation status". Despite containing some softening of language following Israeli protests over a previous version, Israel continued to denounce the text. The resolution refers to the site Jews and Christians refer to as the Temple Mount, or Har HaBayit in Hebrew, only by its Arab name — a significant semantic decision also adopted by UNESCO's executive board, triggering condemnation from Israel and its allies. U.S. Ambassador Crystal Nix Hines stated: "This item should have been defeated. These politicized and one-sided resolutions are damaging the credibility of UNESCO."

In October 2017, the United States and Israel announced they would withdraw from the organization, citing in-part anti-Israel bias.

Palestine

Palestinian youth magazine controversy 

In February 2011, an article was published in a Palestinian youth magazine in which a teenage girl described one of her four role models as Adolf Hitler. In December 2011, UNESCO, which partly funded the magazine, condemned the material and subsequently withdrew support.

Islamic University of Gaza controversy 

In 2012, UNESCO decided to establish a chair at the Islamic University of Gaza in the field of astronomy, astrophysics, and space sciences, fueling controversy and criticism. Israel bombed the school in 2008 stating that they develop and store weapons there, which Israel restated in criticizing UNESCO's move.

The head, Kamalain Shaath, defended UNESCO, stating that "the Islamic University is a purely academic university that is interested only in education and its development". Israeli ambassador to UNESCO Nimrod Barkan planned to submit a letter of protest with information about the university's ties to Hamas, especially angry that this was the first Palestinian university that UNESCO chose to cooperate with. The Jewish organization B'nai B'rith criticized the move as well.

Listing Nanjing Massacre documents 

In 2015, Japan threatened to halt funding for UNESCO over the organization's decision to include documents relating to the 1937 Nanjing massacre in the latest listing for its "Memory of the World" program. In October 2016, Japanese Foreign Minister Fumio Kishida confirmed that Japan's 2016 annual funding of ¥4.4 billion had been suspended, although he denied any direct link with the Nanjing document controversy.

US withdrawals 

The United States withdrew from UNESCO in 1984, citing the "highly politicized" nature of the organisation, its ostensible "hostility toward the basic institutions of a free society, especially a free market and a free press", as well as its "unrestrained budgetary expansion", and poor management under then Director-General Amadou-Mahtar M'Bow of Senegal.

On 19 September 1989, former U.S. Congressman Jim Leach stated before a Congressional subcommittee:

Leach concluded that the record showed Israel bashing, a call for a new world information order, money management, and arms control policy to be the impetus behind the withdrawal; he asserted that before departing from UNESCO, a withdrawal from the IAEA had been pushed on him. On 1 October 2003, the U.S. rejoined UNESCO.

On 12 October 2017, the United States notified UNESCO that it would again withdraw from the organization, on 31 December 2018; Israel followed suit. The Department of State cited "mounting arrears at UNESCO, the need for fundamental reform in the organization, and continuing anti-Israel bias at UNESCO".

The United States has not paid over $600 million in dues since it stopped paying its $80 million annual UNESCO dues when Palestine became a full member in 2011. Israel and the US were among the 14 votes against the membership out of 194 member countries.

Kurdish-Turkish conflict 

On 25 May 2016, the noted Turkish poet and human rights activist Zülfü Livaneli resigned as Turkey's only UNESCO goodwill ambassador. He highlighted the human rights situation in Turkey and the destruction of historical Sur district of Diyarbakir, the largest city in Kurdish-majority southeast Turkey, during fighting between the Turkish army and Kurdish militants as the main reasons for his resignation. Livaneli said: "To pontificate on peace while remaining silent against such violations is a contradiction of the fundamental ideals of UNESCO."

Campaigns against illicit art trading 
In 2020 UNESCO stated that the size of the illicit trade in cultural property amounted to 10 billion dollars a year. A report that same year by the Rand Organisation suggested the actual market is "not likely to be larger than a few hundred million dollars each year". An expert cited by UNESCO as attributing the 10 billion figure denied it and said he had "no idea" where the figure came from. Art dealers were particularly critical of the UNESCO figure, because it amounted to 15% of the total world art market.

In November 2020 part of a UNESCO advertising campaign intended to highlight international trafficking in looted artefacts had to be withdrawn, after it falsely presented a series of museum-held artworks with known provenances as recently looted objects held in private collections. The adverts claimed that a head of Buddha in the Metropolitan Museum's collection since 1930 had been looted from Kabul Museum in 2001 and then smuggled into the US art market; that a funerary monument from Palmyra that the MET had acquired in 1901 had been recently looted from the Palmyra Museum by Islamic State militants and then smuggled into the European antiquities market, and that an Ivory Coast mask with a provenance that indicates it was in the US by 1954 was looted during armed clashes in 2010–2011. After complaints from the MET, the adverts were withdrawn.

Products and services 

 UNESDOC Database – Contains over 146,000 UNESCO documents in full text published since 1945 as well as metadata from the collections of the UNESCO Library and documentation centres in field offices and institutes.

Information processing tools 

UNESCO develops, maintains and disseminates, free of charge, two interrelated software packages for database management (CDS/ISIS [not to be confused with UK police software package ISIS]) and data mining/statistical analysis (IDAMS).

 CDS/ISIS – a generalised information storage and retrieval system. The Windows version may run on a single computer or in a local area network. The JavaISIS client/server components allow remote database management over the Internet and are available for Windows, Linux and Macintosh. Furthermore, GenISIS allows the user to produce HTML Web forms for CDS/ISIS database searching. The ISIS_DLL provides an API for developing CDS/ISIS based applications.
 OpenIDAMS – a software package for processing and analysing numerical data developed, maintained and disseminated by UNESCO. The original package was proprietary but UNESCO has initiated a project to provide it as open-source.
 IDIS – a tool for direct data exchange between CDS/ISIS and IDAMS

See also 

 Academic mobility network
 League of Nations archives
 UNESCO Intangible Cultural Heritage Lists
 UNESCO Reclining Figure 1957–58, sculpture by Henry Moore
 UniRef

References

Further reading 

 Finnemore, Martha. 1993. "International Organizations as Teachers of Norms: The United Nations Educational, Scientific, and Cutural  Organization and Science Policy." International Organization Vol. 47, No. 4 (Autumn, 1993), pp. 565–597

External links 

 

 
Organizations established in 1945
Conservation and restoration organizations
Heritage organizations
International cultural organizations
International educational organizations
International scientific organizations
International organizations based in France
Organizations based in Paris
United Nations Development Group
United Nations specialized agencies
France and the United Nations
1945 establishments in France
Peace organizations